Anacampsis aedificata is a moth of the family Gelechiidae. It was described by Edward Meyrick in 1929. It is found in Brazil (Para).

The wingspan is about 8 mm. The forewings are dark grey, irregularly irrorated whitish and the costa suffusedly irrorated white. There is a curved transverse irregular blackish streak about one-fifth, not reaching the dorsum. There is also a semi-oval black blotch on the costa before the middle and an acutely angulated whitish line from the costa at three-fourths to the tornus, preceded on the costal half by broad blackish fascia. The area beyond this is suffusedly irrorated white
on the lower half and a spot above the apex, the remainder blackish. The hindwings are rather dark grey.

References

Moths described in 1929
Anacampsis
Moths of South America